Olivia Anderson (born 30 May 1999) is a Canadian swimmer. She competed in the women's 1500 metre freestyle event at the 2017 World Aquatics Championships.

References

External links
 

1999 births
Living people
Place of birth missing (living people)
Canadian female freestyle swimmers